The 1987 Pacific hurricane season was the last year in which the Eastern Pacific Hurricane Center was the primary warning center for tropical cyclones in the eastern Pacific Ocean. The season officially started May 15, 1987, in the eastern Pacific, and June 1, 1987, in the central Pacific, and lasted until November 30, 1987. These dates conventionally delimit the period of each year when the vast majority of tropical cyclones form in the northeastern Pacific Ocean.

Despite there being 20 named systems, five above the average, only four storms directly affected land. Hurricane Eugene was the first Pacific hurricane to make landfall in Mexico in July since the 1954 season and caused three deaths and $142.12 million damage. Tropical Storm Pilar and Hurricane Norma also came close to land, with the former producing record rain in Baja California Sur. The remnants of Hurricanes Ramon and Norma caused rain in the Continental United States, with the former responsible for five traffic-related deaths. Elsewhere, Peke was a central north Pacific hurricane that crossed the International Date Line and became a typhoon of the 1987 Pacific typhoon season.

Seasonal summary 

Overall, the season continued the general trend in the 1980s of well above-average seasons in the East Pacific. In 1987, there were 20 tropical storms, 10 hurricanes, and four major hurricanes, all were well above average, save the number of major hurricanes which was only slightly above normal. The former made 1987 the fifth most active season on record at that time. Today, 1987 is tied with the 1994 Pacific hurricane season and the 2009 Pacific hurricane season as the sixth most active on record.  In the Central Pacific Hurricane Center's area of responsibility, one storm peaked at hurricane strength (Peke) and one peaked as a tropical storm (Oka). Two tropical storms entered this area of responsibility from the east by crossing 140°W.

The season lasted a total 171 days beginning with the formation of Adrian and early June and the dissipation of Tropical Depression Twenty on November 25. There was a total of 924 storms hours and 631 hurricane hours. By comparison, the long-term averages at that time were 161 season days, 875 tropical storm hours, and 664 hurricane hours. A total of 397 advisories were issued, which was below the 1977–1987 average of 428. The hurricane hunters did not fly into any of the storms in 1987. This was also the first year where tropical storm watches and warnings were issued instead of gale watches and warnings for tropical cyclones. 1987 was the last season that the Eastern Pacific Hurricane Center in Redwood City was responsible for forecasting in this basin, a task it had performed since circa 1972. The EPHC was folded into the National Hurricane Center, which took responsibility for the basin starting in the spring of 1988.

Only one tropical storm developed in June. In July, six named storms formed. Out of these storms, Hilary was the only storm to reach major hurricane status. The month of August had a total of five named storms, four of which became hurricanes. However, August did not feature any major hurricanes, though Hurricane Jova came close, peaking as a moderate Category 2. The month of September held the same number of named storms as August, with five named storms. The month also was the carrier of the strongest hurricane on record at that time (that had its intensity estimated from satellite imagery), Hurricane Max, a strong Category 4 hurricane. Hurricane Norma was a Category 1 hurricane on the Saffir–Simpson scale, which dissipated to the south of the Baja California Peninsula. The month of October featured only two tropical cyclones. The first system, Ramon, was a Category 4 hurricane.

Very few cyclones this season impacted land. The only landfalling hurricane of the year, Hurricane Eugene was responsible for significantly damaging about 15 sq. mi of fruit crop, where damage estimated were at $2.6 million (1987 USD) In all, damage totaled to about $142 million. Tropical Storm Irwin, paralleled the coast of Mexico, causing flooding near Acapulco. Damage there was totaled at $2.1 million (1987 USD). The remnants of Norma and Pilar produced rain over Baja California Sur. The remnants of Ramon brought extremely heavy rains to the Western United States.

The Pacific Decadal Oscillation (PDO) was in a warm phase during this time period, with estimates placing the PDO at +.

Systems

Tropical Storm Adrian 

It strengthened into a tropical storm immediately thereafter. It fell to tropical depression status on June 9 and dissipated later that day. During its life, Adrian paralleled the Mexican shoreline far offshore before looping counter-clockwise over its path when it was a depression.

Tropical Storm Beatriz 

It strengthened into a tropical storm later that day. Beatriz slowly strengthened and moved generally northwest as it stayed far offshore. It weakened thereafter, falling to a depression on July 6 and dissipating the next day.

Tropical Storm Calvin 

Calvin headed generally east. On July 8, as a strong tropical storm.

Tropical Storm Dora 

Dora headed west-northwest and slowly strengthened. It then steadily weakened, becoming a depression two days later.

Hurricane Eugene 

A tropical disturbance developed into a tropical depression on July 22 near the coast of Mexico. It initially headed westward and strengthened into a tropical storm the same day it formed. It strengthened into a hurricane, the first of the season, on July 24 as an upper-level cyclone pulled the system north. After peaking as a low-end Category 2 hurricane on July 25, land interaction weakened the hurricane to Category 1 as it made landfall west of Manzanillo. The rough topography weakened Eugene, and the hurricane was only a depression when it emerged into the Gulf of California. It promptly dissipated on July 26.

When the storm first posed a threat to Mexico on July 24, the port of Zinuhuatenjo was closed for small craft. Operation classes were suspended in Acapulco. In Manzanillo, the port was officially closed down. The weather service issued navigation warnings for three coastal states and ships were urged to maintain contact with officials. Hurricane Eugene caused extremely heavy rain in coastal parts of Mexico. The highest rain was 20.68 inches at Aquila, Michoacán. The system was responsible for the highest tropical cyclone caused rainfall in five Mexican states. Over 5,000 people were displaced. In Manzanillo alone, at least 60 people were rendered homeless. Most of the damage was the scattering of debris and mud. Six people were injured, and a man in Venustiano Carrazano was killed when a palm tree was blown over. In all, three fatalities were reported. The hurricane destroyed about 15 sq. mi (39 km2) of fruit crop in the country, amounting to more than $2.6 million in damage (1987 USD). Additionally, damage to eight beach houses totaled to $120,000. Total crop damage reached $142 million (1987 USD); In the aftermath of the storm, the navy and army and local government devised a cleanup plan. They worked quickly to restore water and power service, and within a few days the services had been restored for most of the impacted area.

Tropical Storm Fernanda 

At a location more westerly than typical for eastern Pacific hurricanes, Tropical Depression Nine-E formed on July 24. Heading west, the cyclone reached tropical storm intensity on July 25. Fernanda strengthened and reached its peak strength near hurricane status on July 26, the same day it crossed 140°W and entered the central north Pacific. Fernanda headed in the general direction of the Hawaiian Islands as a trough approached. The trough caused wind shear, which weakened the cyclone into a tropical depression on July 28. Fernanda dissipated three days later.

Hurricane Greg 

A tropical wave left the coast of Panama on July 26. Over  water, the cyclone steadily intensified as it roughly paralleled the Mexican coast while remaining far offshore. Greg became a hurricane on 1800 UTC July 31 and peaked with wind speeds of 80 mph (130 kmh) on August 1. It then weakened as it moved over cooler water, falling to tropical storm intensity later on August 1. It then weakened into depression intensity on August 2, and completely dissipated the next day. Greg affected Mexico a few weeks after Eugene did, resulting in additional flooding. Due to both storms, the region registered rainfall amounts for times the average.

Hurricane Hilary 

A tropical wave moved through Central America on July 30 and July 31. Steered by a large deep-layer ridge that extended as far southwest as Hawaii and as far northeast as Oklahoma, the wave moved steadily west-northwest. Thunderstorm activity increased considerably after 0000 UTC on July 31. The cyclone strengthened at a steady pace and reached hurricane intensity on August 1. Hilary continued strengthening, and became a hurricane on August 2. On August 3, the cyclone reached Category 3 status on the Saffir–Simpson scale, making it the first major hurricane of the season. It then weakened, and had fallen to Category 1 intensity on August 5. The hurricane then restrengthened, maintaining Category 2 intensity until August 6. The system then began a terminal weakening trend. By August 7 it was only a tropical storm. After falling to depression strength, Hilary dissipated on August 9 over  waters. In Southern California, officials hoped that Hilary would produce a major increase in waves in time for a surfing tournament finals, though only a small increase in wave action was expected.

Tropical Storm Irwin 

The depression quickly intensified into a tropical storm. Irwin fluctuated in strength as it closely paralleled the coast of Mexico. During August 8, Irwin turned nearly due west and headed out to sea. Irwin weakened to a tropical depression on August 9 and immediately dissipated. Forecasters at one point in time noted the possibility of the storm impacting California. In addition, the storm produced heavy rainfall in Mexico, causing $2.1 million in damage. Although many businesses and homes received damage, no deaths were reported.

Hurricane Jova 

The cyclone intensified into Tropical Storm Jova the next day. The depression initially moved to the west-southwest due to a ridge north of the system. It slowly strengthened and reached hurricane intensity on 1800 UTC August 16. The intensifying hurricane then turned west-northwest. When it peaked on August 17, Jova was a moderate Category 2 hurricane. After peaking, Jova slowly weakened as it turned westbound. It was in a moderately declining state when it crossed 140°W and entered the Central Pacific Hurricane Center's area of responsibility. Jova continued to weaken, and was a depression by August 20. Jova dissipated two days later while due south of the Big Island of Hawaii over  water, although it remnants were still visible south of Johnston Atoll until at least August 24. Jova generated heavy surf for a few days in Southern California.

Tropical Storm Oka 

A disturbance in the Intertropical Convergence Zone organized into Tropical Depression One-C on August 26. Twelve hours later, it was upgraded to a tropical storm and named Oka, which is Hawaiian for Oscar. Oka slowly moved west-northwest and reached its peak wind speed of 60 mph (95 kmh) on August 27. The next day, a nearby trough caused wind shear, which weakened Oka to a depression on August 29 and subsequently destroyed it.

Tropical Storm Knut 

Twelve hours later, it strengthened into a tropical storm and was named Knut. Never attaining winds stronger than 40 mph (65 kmh), Knut stayed a tropical storm for one day. It weakened to a tropical depression on August 30 and dissipated later that day. The cyclone stayed out at sea for its entire life, and never threatened land.

Knut had no impact on land. However, its name was retired in 1992 for unknown reasons and was replaced by Kenneth.

Hurricane Lidia 

Lidia originated from a disturbance that entered the basin on August 28. It remained south of the Mexican coast in an area of warm sea surface temperatures, and at 1800 UTC August 29, Tropical Depression Fifteen formed. Lidia moved northwest, paralleling the Mexican coast. It edged in a more westerly direction for a day before resuming its northwesterly path, and reached hurricane intensity on 0600 UTC September 1. Shortly thereafter, Lidia began weakening and lost hurricane intensity on September 2. Lidia weakened very rapidly over cold water. Early the next day, Lidia weakened to a tropical depression and dissipated over  waters on 1200 UTC September 3. The remnants of the storm; however, brought showers to California. One woman was injured by a lightning strike.

Hurricane Max 

A tropical disturbance left Central America on September 8. At 1200 UTC on September 9, a tropical depression formed over the warm waters south of the Gulf of Tehuantepec. Tracking west-northwest, Max rapidly intensified and became a hurricane on September 11, over a day after it was named. Turning northwest, Max continued to intensify. By September 10, the cyclone reached Category 2  intensity, and became a major hurricane several hours later. On September 12, Hurricane Max reached Category 4 intensity. Meanwhile, a then-record was set for the highest satellite estimates for a Pacific hurricane. At that time, Dvorak classifications, which measure a tropical cyclones intensity, were at T7.0/, which was then the highest ever recorded in the basin, though this was later matched by hurricanes Hernan and Trudy of the 1990 Pacific hurricane season.

Max maintained its intensity for 24 hours. However, the storm crossed the  isotherm and began to weaken rapidly. The hurricane's track then shifted north for a time, before turning to the west on September 15. That same day, the weakened to a tropical storm. The hurricane was predicted to send  waves to Southern California, though Max was well past its peak at that time.

Hurricane Norma 

Moving northwest, a depression formed on September 14 far from land. It took over 24 hours to reach tropical storm strength. Norma paralleled the coast far offshore. The storm steadily intensified over  sea surface temperatures. On September 17, Norma turned to the north, and became a minimal hurricane for 12 hours as an eye became visible on infrared imagery. Norma turned northbound toward land. However, Norma remained offshore due weak southwesterly flow from a cutoff low located west of Baja California Sur. The cyclone stalled and then edged slightly east when it weakened back into a depression on September 19.

Prior to the remains of Hurricane Norma's arrival in the Southwestern United States, forecasters were anticipating cloudy skies over San Diego. Over the deserts and mountains near the area, there was also a possibility of heavy rainfall. The remnants ultimately caused rainfall and thunderstorms in California on September 22 and September 23. There were numerous power outages, small fires, some road flooding, and some property damage. In San Diego and southern Orange County, 200,000 homes and business lost power, but the power was quickly restored. However, there are no reports of damage or flooding in Baja California from the storm; the area the tropical cyclone struck was sparsely populated.

Hurricane Otis 

Otis originated from the a tropical disturbance embedded in the monsoon trough. It moved over the warm waters south of the Mexican Riviera from September 17 to September 19. At 0000 UTC September 20, the disturbance was upgraded into Tropical Depression Nineteen-E while moving to the northwest. Eighteen hours later on September 21, Otis intensified into a hurricane. It also began to turn back to the west and began to undergo a period of rapid deepening. It would oscillate irregularly between that strength and Category 2 intensity until September 24. That day, it began accelerating to the west as it lost strength due to increased wind shear and decreasing ocean temperature. Otis fell to tropical storm strength on September 25 and a depression on September 26, and dissipated shortly after that.

Hurricane Peke 

An area of disturbed weather southwest of Hawaii gathered enough convection and a closed circulation to become Tropical Depression Two-C on September 21. It immediately strengthened into a storm and was named Peke. Peke continued to strengthen as it tracked north just east of the International Date Line. Peke intensified into a hurricane on September 23 and reached Category 2 intensity the next day. Peke continued heading north and shortly after weakening into a Category 1 hurricane, it turned to the northwest and crossed the dateline. It re-intensified, and peaked as a  typhoon on September 23. It accelerated to the northwest and began to take in drier air, which caused weakening. On October 2, Peke re-curved to the southeast. The last advisory on this tropical cyclone was issued on October 3 as it dissipated. Peke's remnants continued drifting erratically for over three days, first heading east, then northwest, and then southeast, at which time they were finally unidentifiable.

Hurricane/Typhoon Peke caused no damages or deaths. However, was also the first tropical cyclone of hurricane strength to cross the dateline since Hurricane Sarah (1967) to cross the dateline at that strength. In addition, Peke was the third tropical cyclone in three years to exist on both sides of the dateline, after 1985's Typhoon Skip and 1986's Typhoon Georgette.

Tropical Storm Pilar 

It headed north and peaked as a minimal tropical storm on October 1. After being a tropical storm for a mere six hours, Pilar weakened to a depression and dissipated that same day. It never made landfall, dissipating just south of the southern tip of the Baja California Peninsula. It was a tropical cyclone for a total of 24 hours. The system caused no known damage on land, but Pilar dropped heavy precipitation on Baja California Sur from 1200 UTC on September 30 until 0000 UTC October 2. An observer station reported  of rainfall. This was the most rainfall the weather station had ever recorded since its founding in 1969.

Hurricane Ramon 

On October 3–4 an area of disturbed weather moved into the Pacific Ocean south of a high-pressure area over Central Mexico. The storm became better organized over  waters. It moved generally to the west-northwest. Ramon intensified into a hurricane on October 7 and reached major hurricane status on October 8. After peaking, Ramon turned to the northwest due to interaction with subtropical jetstream winds and rapidly weakened over cooler sea surface temperatures. It became a tropical storm on October 11 and a depression on October 12. It dissipated shortly thereafter.

Torrential rains deluged Southern California, resulting in street flooding. Two people perished in separate traffic accidents. In Los Angeles, three more people perished in separate traffic incidents. Heavy rains extended west and was also reported in Hemet in Riverside County, where three people were also injured during a car accident. The rains helped dissolve a week-long forest fire 16,000 acre (65,000,000 m2) on Mt. Palomar. The Spring Creek River overflowed its banks. The tropical moisture also helped end a 37-day dry spell at Salt Lake City, marking the longest time the city went without rain since 1964. Nationwide, Ramon killed five people, all due to road-related incidents.

Tropical Storm Selma 

On October 27, a tropical depression formed and headed northwest, gradually re-curving north. It intensified into a  tropical storm on October 28. Selma maintained that strength until the next day, when it weakened to a depression. Selma's re-curving continued, and on October 29, it again intensified into a  tropical storm.

Tropical depressions 

On June 10, a weak tropical depression, the second of the season, developed. It moved very little and did not affect land. It dissipated on 1200 UTC June 12. The season's next tropical cyclone, Tropical Depression Three formed six days after the previous one dissipated. On June 20, it dissipated.

The depression had same peak intensity as Three and had dissipated on July 17. According to the Joint Typhoon Warning Center, on July 18 a tropical depression formed east of the International Date Line, and two days later it exited CPHC's area of responsibility; however, this storm was not included into CPHC database. As it entered into western Pacific, it strengthened as a tropical storm and received the name Wynne. A very weak cyclone, the depression dissipated on November 25, ending the above-average season.

Storm names 
The following names were used for named storms that formed in the eastern Pacific in 1987. The names not retired from this list were used again in the 1993 season. This is the same list used for the 1981 season. However, the names Xina, York, and Zelda were added to name lists for odd-numbered years sometime after 1985 due to that year's season threatening to exhaust the list. Storms were named Pilar and Ramon for the first time in 1987, as the name Selma had been used on the older lists.

Two names from the Central Pacific list were used – Oka and Peke. This was the first usage for both names.

Retirement 
The World Meteorological Organization retired one Eastern Pacific name in the spring of 1992: Knut. It was replaced in the 1993 season by Kenneth.

See also 

 List of Pacific hurricanes
 Pacific hurricane season
 1987 Atlantic hurricane season
 1987 Pacific typhoon season
 1987 North Indian Ocean cyclone season
 Southern Hemisphere tropical cyclone seasons: 1986–87, 1987–88

References

External links 
 Unisys Weather archive for the Eastern Pacific, 1987
 Central Pacific Hurricane Center archive
 Monthly Weather Review

 
Pacific hurricane seasons
Articles which contain graphical timelines
1987 EPAC T